The Open the Brave Gate Championship is a professional wrestling title in Japanese promotion Dragon Gate; it has a weight limit of , though it has been defended against heavier wrestlers in the past. It can be considered the secondary singles title in Dragon Gate and is more of a light heavyweight championship.

Title history

The championship was created on March 13, 2005 when Naruki Doi defeated Yossino in a tournament final. The faceplate logo on the belt is divided into eight pieces, each piece representing the eight wrestlers who fought in the tournament to determine the inaugural champion. During Gamma's reign, he threw away all eight pieces of the faceplate and replaced it with his own plate, renaming it Open the Gamma Gate, dictating and often changing the rules of his title defenses. This ended when Masato Yoshino, wrestling as the masked Dr. Muscle, defeated Gamma and restored it to the Brave Gate title, vacating it soon afterwards. 

There have been a total of 46 reigns shared between 30 different champions. The current champion is Minorita who is in his first reign.

Reigns

Combined reigns

Notes
1. –

See also
Dragon Gate
Open the Dream Gate Championship

References

External links
Official title history
DGUSA title history
Wrestling-Titles.com title history
 Open the Brave Gate Championship

Dragon Gate (wrestling) championships
Light heavyweight wrestling championships